Ilmor is a British independent high-performance motor racing engineering company. It was founded by Mario Illien and Paul Morgan in November 1983. With manufacturing based in Brixworth, Northamptonshire, and maintenance offices in Plymouth, Michigan, the company supplies engines and consultancy to the IndyCar Series and MotoGP.

After originally developing IndyCar engines, the company built a partnership with Mercedes-Benz to power F1 cars for both the Sauber and McLaren teams. After the death of Paul Morgan in a vintage aeroplane crash in 2001, Mercedes increased its stake until it owned the entire company, and renamed it Mercedes-Benz High Performance Engines Ltd. In 2005, Mario Illien concluded a deal to purchase the Special Projects part of the company in partnership with Roger Penske, which worked in partnership with Honda Performance Development for IndyCar engines between 2003 and 2011. This new company, which is independent of Mercedes, is once again known as Ilmor Engineering Ltd. They developed the Ilmor X3 for the 2007 MotoGP World Motorcycle Championship, entering one race before withdrawing and effectively shutting down the race team, due to funding problems.

Racing remains the core part of the business today and Ilmor acts as a consultant for motorsport clients from all forms of racing. However, the business is now using its racing expertise to diversify into other areas such as OEM automotive, defence, marine and energy efficient engine applications.

2.65 litre Indy car V-8

Both engineers were working at Cosworth on the Cosworth DFX turbocharged methanol engine for the CART Indy Car World Series; differences of opinion over the direction in which DFX development should go (Cosworth were inherently conservative as they had a near monopoly) led them to break away from their parent company to pursue their own ideas. There was some acrimony in their split from Cosworth, their former employer claiming that the Ilmor engine was little different from their planned modifications to the DFX.

Founded as an independent British engine manufacturer in 1983, it started building engines for Indy cars with the money of team owner and chassis manufacturer Roger Penske. The Ilmor 265-A, badged initially as the Ilmor-Chevrolet Indy V-8, debuted at the 1986 Indianapolis 500 with Team Penske driver Al Unser. In 1987, the engine program expanded to all three Penske team drivers (Rick Mears, Danny Sullivan, and Al Unser), Patrick Racing, and Newman/Haas Racing. Mario Andretti, driving for Newman/Haas, won at Long Beach, the engine's first Indy car victory. He also won the pole position for the 1987 Indianapolis 500. A year later, Rick Mears won the 1988 Indianapolis 500, the engine's first win at Indianapolis. The engine went on to have a stellar record in CART. From 1987 to 1991, the "Chevy-A" engine won 64 of 78 races.

In 1992, the 265-A engine was followed up by the 265-B engine. The "Chevy-B" was fielded singly by Penske Racing (Rick Mears and Emerson Fittipaldi) in 1992 and won four CART series races. All other Ilmor teams remained with the venerable "Chevy-A" for 1992. Bobby Rahal, driving a "Chevy-A" won the 1992 CART championship, the fifth consecutive (and final) for the 265-A. Al Unser Jr. won the 1992 Indianapolis 500 driving a "Chevy-A", also the fifth consecutive (and final) Indy 500 win for the 265-A. Emerson Fittipaldi drove a "Chevy-B" to 4th place in points, but both he and Mears dropped out of that year's Indy 500 due to crashes. It was at this time that Ilmor was receiving new competition from Cosworth, which had just introduced their new powerplant, the Ford-Cosworth XB.

For the 1993 season, the 265-C engine was introduced, intended to replace both the 265-A and the 265-B. The "Chevy-C" was used widespread, and produced continued success for Ilmor. Some backmarker teams continued to utilize the "A" and "B" engines during the 1993 season, but neither the "A" nor the "B" would win another Indy car race. Chevrolet dropped its badging support after the 1993 season.

For the 1994 season, two new engines were introduced. The 265-D engine replaced the 265-C, although some of the smaller teams still ran the "C" throughout 1994. Without badging support, the engines were referred to simply as the "Ilmor-C" and the "Ilmor-D". The other engine introduced in 1994 was the top-secret 265-E (see below), which was actually a 3.43 liter pushrod engine, used by Penske Racing at the 1994 Indianapolis 500.

For 1995, Mercedes-Benz became the badging manufacturer for the Ilmor Indy car engines. The engine continued to be a strong contender on the CART circuit. In 1996, the open wheel "split" began between CART and the IRL. Ilmor primarily was a provider for CART-based teams, and did not provide engines for any full-time IRL teams. At the 1996 Indy 500, the "Ilmor Mercedes-Benz D" was used by Galles Racing, and finished second, the powerplant's one and only start in an IRL-sanctioned race. When the IRL switched to normally-aspirated engines for 1997, the 265s were no longer permitted in the IRL and the Indy 500, and from that point on raced in the CART series exclusively.

F1 debut

In 1991 Ilmor entered Formula 1 with a V10 engine as exclusive supplier to the ambitious Leyton House team (formerly March). After some troubles Leyton House returned to racing as March again in 1992, still using Ilmor engines. Ilmor also supplied engines to the Tyrrell team, starting from 1992. Powered by the Ilmor V10, Tyrrell scored 8 points through Andrea de Cesaris and March another 3 through Karl Wendlinger.

Sauber

Ilmor were gaining a reasonable reputation in F1, and so the Sauber sportscar team and Mercedes-Benz, who were planning their Formula One entry together, signed a deal with Ilmor after scrapping plans for a Mercedes engine. In order to protect their image, Mercedes took on an observational role in the project and the cars had "Concept by Mercedes-Benz" written in the engine cover.

After scoring 12 points in 1993, Mercedes entered officially in 1994 using an updated version of the 1993 engine, and now "Powered by Mercedes-Benz" was seen on the Sauber engine-cover. The same year Mercedes-Benz acquired Chevrolet's 25% share of Ilmor.

In 1994 Ilmor also supplied the new Pacific GP team of Keith Wiggins with the old 1993 spec customer engines. In 32 attempts, the Pacific cars qualified seven times. After Pacific GP Lotus lost its Ilmor customer supply deal to Ford Zetec in 1995, Ilmor decided to reposition its Formula One involvement.

Racing in the United States

The 265D V8s ran the entire 1994 Indy Car season badged as "Ilmor Indy V8", with Team Penske headlining the program, which included free engines.

In 1994, Ilmor produced the Mercedes-Benz 500I engine for Team Penske (although work on this started long before the Mercedes takeover as a private project between Ilmor and Penske). The 500I exploited a loophole in the engine rules at the Indianapolis 500 (which was run under slightly different rules to other CART races). Originally stock-block engines based on production units, fitted with two pushrod and rocker arm actuated valves per cylinder, were permitted to run at increased cubic capacity (3.43 litres vs 2.65 litres) and significantly greater turbo boost than the pure racing engines. For several years Buick V6 units had been extremely fast but fragile; the restrictions were relaxed with the intent of permitting Buick-like engines to use stronger but still production-like blocks – the Menard engine based on the Buick took this approach, as did the unsuccessful Greenfield V8.

Ilmor realized that this provided scope for a completely new pure-bred racing engine – it would need to retain pushrods, but could be designed specifically for the requirements of the Indianapolis 500, and in strict secrecy schemed a completely new V8 engine which was approximately  more powerful than the Cosworth XB and Ilmor 265D opposition. Team Penske's cars were by far the fastest at the 1994 Indianapolis 500, and Al Unser Jr. won the race, with Emerson Fittipaldi also figuring strongly until an accident on lap 184. The loophole was closed for 1995, and Penske, a year behind on development for Indy, failed to qualify their 265D-powered cars for that year's 500.

For 1995 the 265D V8s were rebadged Mercedes and continued to be highly competitive, with Al Unser Jr. finishing runner-up with four wins. Rahal-Hogan Racing joined Penske as major teams, as Bobby Rahal collected five podiums to finish third in the overall standings. In 1996, Penske's Unser Jr. finished fourth, Rahal seventh and his teammate Bryan Herta eighth, with neither collecting wins. In 1997, Unser Jr. had a poor season, whereas Penske teammate Paul Tracy claimed three wins but retired in the last five races to finish fifth in the standings. PacWest drivers Maurício Gugelmin and Mark Blundell claimed four wins combined and finished fourth and sixth in the standings.  Forsythe driver Greg Moore got two wins and three second places, but retired in eight races and finished seventh. After the CART-IRL split, Mercedes gradually lost interest in American racing and left CART after the 2000 season.

Ilmor continued working in the United States on the Oldsmobile Aurora V8 for the IRL Penske entries.

In 2003 Honda partnered with Ilmor on the Honda Indy V8 engine between 2003 and 2011 for co-assembling, preparation, tune-up and maintenance. At the conclusion of the 2011 season, Honda discontinued their partnership with Ilmor subsequently moving all design, development and production in house without any third-party tune-up partnership to HPD, for the 2012 Honda Indy V6.

In 2012 Chevrolet returned to the IndyCar Series, partnering with Ilmor on the Chevrolet Indy V6 engine program and supplying free engines for Team Penske and rest of Chevrolet-powered IndyCar Series teams are customers by pay lease system.

Ilmor is the option specification engine supplier of engines for the ARCA Menards Series and NASCAR Camping World Truck Series. Truck Series teams are allowed to use the option crate engine based on the LSX, and many teams have switched to the option engine. Ilmor was heavily criticized when four of its NT1 engines failed during the 2019 World of Westgate 200 at Las Vegas Motor Speedway, effectively eliminating ThorSport Racing drivers Grant Enfinger and Johnny Sauter from the playoffs. Matt Crafton also experienced an engine failure during the race, but survived the playoffs due to his points standings. The manufacturer took responsibility for the engines that suffered from severe detonation due to the combination of the high engine load condition combined with the extreme weather conditions in Las Vegas. Despite Ilmor's announcement, NASCAR denied ThorSport's request to reinstate Enfinger and Sauter into the playoffs.

In 2021 Ilmor partnered with Edelbrock to supply the 396 engine, which is primarily used in ARCA, for the Superstar Racing Experience.

Mercedes-Benz in Formula One

Back in F1, for 1995 Mercedes had set its sights on higher goals and went looking for an engine supply deal with a more competitive team as Ilmor elected to reposition its Formula One programme from engine supplier to trusted engine builder and assembler partner for Mercedes-Benz. Sauber had the opportunity to become a customer team, but team principal Peter Sauber opted to sign a deal with Ford instead. From then on Ilmor built the Mercedes-Benz engines exclusively for McLaren after Ilmor repositioned its Formula One involvement from independent engine manufacturer to trusted engine builder and assembler to Mercedes-Benz High Performance Engines.

The Ilmor engines went on to be hugely successful with McLaren, scoring several podiums in both 1995 and 1996, leading to three wins in 1997 and back to back drivers championship in 1998 and 1999, as well as the constructor's championship in 1998. Although they did not win another championship until 2008 the Ilmor-Mercedes engines won several races.

In 2001 Paul Morgan was killed while landing one of his vintage airplanes, a Hawker Sea Fury at Sywell Aerodrome, Northamptonshire. In 2002 DaimlerChrysler increased its share to 55% and renamed the company Mercedes-Ilmor. In 2005 DaimlerChrysler became the sole owner of Ilmor and renamed the company Mercedes-Benz High Performance Engines Ltd.

Ilmor Engineering, Inc. – expansion to the U.S.

Ilmor Engineering, Inc., a sister company to Ilmor U.K., was incorporated in 1990 (President – Paul Ray) with the primary goal of providing engineering support to customers using the Ilmor Ltd.-manufactured Chevrolet 265A Indy Car engine. In 1998, the headquarters moved from its original facility in Redford, Michigan, into a custom-built,  facility in Plymouth, Michigan. The new facility housed all of the necessary disciplines to support the Indy Car program including design, engineering, engine building, engine test, performance development and trackside support functions.

From its start as an Indy Car engineering and trackside support group Ilmor, Inc.’s capabilities have grown to encompass design and analysis tools, engine and sub-systems test capabilities – including emissions compliance benches, precision manufacturing, electronics and wiring design and manufacture, and facilities for service and support.

Today, the expanded facility (over 44,000 square feet) houses more than 100 people, and produces high performance products in multiple powertrain related arenas including auto racing, boat racing, high-performance road cars, high performance offshore powerboats and custom V-twin motorcycles.

Diversification – Ilmor High Performance Marine, LLC.

As part of a broader desire to diversify the U.S. company's business base, Ilmor, Inc., entered the high-performance marine world in 2002, building race engines for the SuperCat Offshore Racing Series of the American Power Boat Association (APBA). Recognizing the business potential, Ilmor worked with then co-owner DaimlerChrysler to marinize and modify the Dodge Viper's V10.

Late that year, the first two prototype 550 HP engines were installed in a new  sport rubber dinghy. In close collaboration with Pete Hledin of Douglas Marine (the parent company of Skater) and Bob Morgan of Big Thunder Marine, the Ilmor V10's underwent extensive durability testing and the results were encouraging.

Armed with enough knowledge and experience from the initial marine exposure and having completed a comprehensive study of the marine business at large, Ilmor made long term plans to enter the powerboat business in a serious manner. Since 2004, Ilmor's high-performance marine division has enjoyed substantial growth, becoming a well-established supplier in the U.S. and European boat market. In addition to the MV10-550 engine, Ilmor created two additional performance variants: the MV10-625 in 2005, and the MV 7-10 in 2006. The 700-horsepower, naturally aspirated marine engine was developed with significantly improved fuel efficiency and a light-weight package. The MV10-550 was later upgraded to the 570 Hp in 2006.

In 2009, Ilmor had to utilize its engineering expertise to create an entirely new generation of MV-10 marine products. Emissions requirements established by the California Air Resources Board (the most stringent in the U.S.), the federal Environmental Protection Agency and the European Union meant that all high-performance marine engines had to meet tough new exhaust emissions standards. The MV10-650 and the MV10-725, along with state-of-the-art Ilmor designed electronics were created to not only meet but exceed every requirement of the new regulations.  Ilmor's MV10-725 is the highest output emissions certified gasoline engine commercially available in Europe.

As part of its overall marine business development plan, Ilmor also unveiled the all-new INDY high-performance stern-drive in 2009. The INDY drive, two and a half years in the making, was designed to complement not only all of the current Ilmor high-performance marine engines but to handle the power and torque of several other engines aimed for introduction at a later time. The addition of the INDY drive placed Ilmor High Performance Marine firmly into the ranks of marine powertrain suppliers.

Powerboat Racing World Champions

As a natural step for Ilmor, a decision was made in 2007 to enter the MV10 engine into powerboat competition. The twist for Ilmor, which is accustomed to manufacturing bespoke racing engines, was to race only engines identical to those already sold to the more typical high-performance powerboat customer. In the first year of competition for the engines, a pair of Ilmor Marine MV10-625 engines powered the #99 Fountain Worldwide “King of Shaves” powerboat to the coveted 2007 Powerboat P1 Evolution Class World Championship. The successful first year of competition was backed up with two additional European based Powerboat P1 World Championships in 2008 and 2009 and World Championship success in the US in 2008. The success validated Ilmor's belief that its production based high-performance marine engine could race and win against any competition throughout the world.

There has also been great success for the “Cinzano Bianco” race team in the UK marathon powerboat racing world championships. This boat was first raced in 2008 in the Cowes-Torquay-Cowes powerboat race with the MV10-625 engine. With the crew of Tim Grimshaw, Eric Smillie and Nik Keyser.  It came fifth overall and second in marathon class B. It was then raced again in 2009 in the marathon class B series and came first in class and first overall for the class and the whole of the marathon powerboat series. With the crew of Marcus Hendricks, Eric Smillie and Tim Grimshaw. Then in 2010 it was re-rigged with the new range of MV10-725 engines. Shortly after the re-rig the boat was raced in the Around Ireland 2010 powerboat race, which it won overall and won its class. It was then raced in the Cowes-Torquay-Cowes powerboat race of 2010. With the crew of Marcus Hendricks, Eric Smille and Simon Woodpower.

MotoGP

In 2006, Ilmor announced that they would enter a two-bike team in the MotoGP motorcycle racing series  and would enter a single rider team as a wildcard entry in the final two races of the 2006 season. For the 2007 MotoGP season, engine capacity was to be reduced to 800cc from 990cc so Ilmor's wildcard entries in 2006 would be the first appearance of an 800cc MotoGP motorcycle at a race meeting.

Former 500 cc race winner Garry McCoy was confirmed as the rider for the Michelin-shod bike in its 2006 appearances, scoring points both in the 2006 Portuguese Grand Prix at the Autódromo do Estoril and the 2006 Gran Premio de la Comunitat Valenciana, becoming the first rider to score points on an 800cc MotoGP machine, though McCoy finished last on both occasions, four and seven laps down respectively.

On 18 December 2006, Ilmor Engineering confirmed via their website that Jeremy McWilliams and Andrew Pitt had been selected as riders for the 2007 season. On 15 March 2007 after one race, the team announced that they were taking a break from Moto GP as a result of funding issues. On 30 April they announced that they would run a "slimmed-down" set-up focused purely on engine development, releasing all unnecessary personnel but keeping riders McWilliams and Pitt under contract.

Complete Formula One results
(key)

See also
 Mercedes-Benz Motorsport
 Mercedes-Ilmor

Notes

External links

 Ilmor Engineering

Companies established in 1981
Champ Car
Formula One engine manufacturers
IndyCar Series
IndyCar Series engine manufacturers
Motorcycle racing teams
Companies based in Northamptonshire
Engine manufacturers of the United Kingdom
Sauber Motorsport
Motorcycle racing teams established in 2006
Motorcycle racing teams disestablished in 2007